The 1960 Labour Party deputy leadership election took place in November 1960, after the death of sitting deputy leader Aneurin Bevan.

Candidates
 George Brown, former Minister of Works, Member of Parliament (MP) for Belper
 James Callaghan, former Parliamentary and Financial Secretary to the Admiralty, MP for Cardiff South East
 Frederick Lee, former Parliamentary Secretary to the Ministry of Labour and National Service, MP for Newton

The ballot coincided with a leadership election, where leader Hugh Gaitskell saw off left-wing challenger Harold Wilson. In the deputy leadership election, Brown and Callaghan both supported Gaitskell, while Lee was aligned with the left wing of the party.

Results

As a result of the first round, Callaghan was eliminated.  The remaining two candidates faced each other in a second round.

Sources
http://privatewww.essex.ac.uk/~tquinn/labour_party_deputy.htm

References

1960
1960 elections in the United Kingdom
Labour Party deputy leadership election